Araeopteron obliquifascia is a species of moth of the  family Erebidae. It is found on Mauritius and Réunion.

Its wingspan is 11 mm.

References

Moths described in 1910
Boletobiinae
Moths of Mauritius
Moths of Réunion